TAB New Zealand (TAB NZ), formerly the New Zealand Racing Board (NZRB) and the Racing Industry Transition Agency (RITA), now the TAB again, is a statutory monopoly for New Zealand sports betting, including betting on horse racing and greyhound racing. It was established under the Racing Act 2003 to operate the TAB, promote the racing industry and maximise the profits of the industry. It broadcasts racing on two television channels TAB Trackside 1 and TAB Trackside 2.

The Board has an obligation under the Racing Act to regulate and improve the New Zealand racing industry. It must schedule the racing calendar to maximise profit. It must promote wider ownership of racehorses and greyhounds, and best practice amongst racing clubs and racing events. It must also aim to improve the technology and efficiency of the industry, improve the atmosphere of race day events and improve the facilities of racing venues.

TAB

The NZ Racing Board's income comes from TAB betting revenue. The NZ Racing Board operates around 675 TAB outlets throughout New Zealand as well as On-course Tote Terminals, Internet, Phonebet and Touch Tone wagering channels. TAB Touch Tone, Phonebet and Internet wagering channels service more than 170,000 TAB account holders.

The TAB offers a wide range of totalisator and fixed-odds betting products. Just over 80 percent of the totalisator betting dollar is returned to the customer. The rest is returned to the racing and sporting codes, after tax and NZ Racing Board costs.

TAB wagering channels

The TAB has several different wagering channels, tailored to meet the requirements of its vastly varying customers:
 Betting at racetracks on raceday
 A national network of streetfront and social venue betting shops, one of New Zealand's largest retail networks
 A national chain of call centres. The Phonebet centres handle more operator-assisted calls than any other New Zealand call centre
 New Zealand's only betting website, www.tab.co.nz
 A Touch Tone phone betting service
 A mobile application on Android and iOS
 Other betting channels exploiting emerging new technologies are in development.

Wagering channels are constantly evolving to provide a premium standard of customer service.

TAB wagering products

The TAB initiated the world's first Government-run totalisator wagering service in 1951. Today a growing range of tote bet types is on offer, from win, place and each way to Poker and All Up bets, Easybets where the computer picks the runners, weighted towards the favourites, and Percentage betting to cut the cost of placing a bet.

In 1996 it added fixed-odds betting to its stable when the TAB began sports betting. Now 31 sporting codes are covered including matches and fixtures around the world, from rugby football, soccer and cricket to sheep shearing. As with race betting, a proportion of every betting dollar is returned to the New Zealand sporting code on which the bet is taken. The choice of sports betting products included head to head, half / full-time double, winning team and margin, and more.

Fixed odds betting is also available on racing, through Futures books, and Final Field.

In June, 2007 Australian racing product became available to New Zealand customers through the commingling of the Australian Super TAB and New Zealand totalisator pools. More recently the Tabcorp agreement has been extended to include Australian wagering on New Zealand racing product. Commingled pools and the expansion of the New Zealand and Australian race programmes provides increased wagering opportunities for customers in both countries. The New Zealand TAB now also take betting on a selection of races from America, England, Hong Kong, Japan, France and Singapore.

Spam complaint

In August 2011, the TAB was subject to a spam complaint with the Department of Internal Affairs.

Impact of COVID-19 pandemic
On 26 May 2020, the TAB announced that 230 staff, or approximately 30 percent of its workforce, would be made redundant as a result of the financial impact of the COVID-19 pandemic in New Zealand.

Responsible gambling
The New Zealand Racing Board, under the Racing Act 2003 and associated Regulations, is required to report on programmes relating to problem gambling, to provide information and advice on problem gambling and to provide problem gambling training. Since its establishment the NZ Racing Board has taken a proactive stance in meetings its responsibilities for harm prevention and minimisation. Initiatives include:
 Self exclusion programmes
 Problem gambling awareness workshops for drug addicts
 Staff intervention policies
 Tools such as maximum bet and loss limits for account holders

Racing
Racing is a long-established sport in New Zealand, with a tradition stretching back to colonial times. Today, the New Zealand racing industry is a major contributor to the New Zealand economy as well as local communities across New Zealand. Racing generates more than $1.4 billion in economic activity each year and creates the equivalent of 18,300 full-time jobs. More than 40,000 people derive their livelihoods from the New Zealand racing industry, not to mention accommodation, travel, fashion and entertainment providers who all benefit from the industry's economic wellbeing. More than one million people have attended race meetings across New Zealand and spent in excess of $55 million on wagering, food, beverages, transport and accommodation in a year.

There are 69 thoroughbred, 51 harness and 12 greyhound clubs licensed to race in New Zealand. Racecourses are situated in 59 locations throughout New Zealand. In the racing year from 1 August 2009 to 31 July 2010, 10,106 races were held throughout New Zealand. Further to this the New Zealand Racing Board carried 35,323 overseas races on their network, for a total of 45,439 races covered for the year, an increase of approximately 27% over the previous year.

The bloodstock industry is of international importance to New Zealand, with the export sale of horses – mainly to Australia and Asia – generating more than $120 million a year. New Zealand-bred runners compete very well overseas and regularly win major races, with a particularly good record in Australian distance races.

A major source of funding for the racing industry is returns from betting on racing and sports, which is conducted by the New Zealand TAB, the retail arm of the New Zealand Racing Board.

The New Zealand Racing Board is a co-ordination point for the three racing codes. They are operated by the three governing bodies, New Zealand Thoroughbred Racing (gallops), Harness Racing New Zealand (trotting and pacing) and New Zealand Greyhound Racing.

The Judicial Control Authority (JCA), established in 1996, is the legal body that administers the rules of racing and conducts inquiries into breaches of the rules, for all three racing codes. The JCA ensures that judicial and appeal proceedings in racing are heard and decided fairly, professionally, efficiently, and in a consistent and cost effective manner. The current focus of the JCA is on contributing to consumer confidence in the racing product.

Board members
The management of the business and affairs of the New Zealand Racing Board takes place under the direction of its governing body, the Board. The seven-member board contains a representative from each of the three codes (greyhound, thoroughbred and harness racing) as well as three independent appointed Board members and the Board Chairman.

Current members are Glenda Hughes (Independent Chair), Rod Croon (Harness Code nominee), Greg McCarthy (Thoroughbred Code nominee), Mauro Barsi (Greyhound Code nominee), Alistair Ryan (Independent Member), Graham Cooney (Independent Member) and Barry Brown (Independent Member).

Governance
The Board has formally constituted three Board committees  - the Dates Committee, the Audit and Finance Committee and the Compensation and Development Committee. These committees support the Board by considering relevant issues at a suitably detailed level and reporting back to the Board.

Each committee has a written charters setting out their roles and responsibilities, membership, functions, reporting procedures and the manner in which they are to operate. The structure and membership of each committee is reviewed annually.

Dates Committee
The Dates Committee is established in accordance with section 42 of the Racing Act 2003, which requires the committee to determine, following consultation with each of the recognised industry organisations, the annual racing calendar that betting will take place on.

Audit and Finance Committee
The Audit and Finance Committee assists the Board in discharging its responsibilities with respect to financial reporting and the financial risk management practices of the NZRB, the work and performance of the internal audit function and the NZ Racing Board's external auditor, Deloitte.

Compensation and Development Committee
The Compensation and Development Committee's purpose is to monitor issues and determine policies and practices related to the remuneration and review of the Chief Executive and the senior management team, as well as overseeing the management development and succession planning process.

Leadership
In late November 2014 the Board of the NZ Racing Board announced the appointment of John Allen as the organisation's new CEO.  John Allen commences his role in early March 2015.

See also
Gambling in New Zealand
Thoroughbred racing in New Zealand

References

New Zealand's Department of Internal Affairs 11 November 2005. Retrieved Feb.15 2006 
New Zealand Racing Board (2005).  Retrieved 15 February 2006.
New Zealand Racing Board Annual Report 2005. Retrieved Feb.15 2006

External links
 New Zealand Racing Board
 TAB

Racing
Gambling regulators
Gambling in New Zealand
Gambling companies of New Zealand
Horse racing organizations
Regulation in New Zealand